Captain Hugh Crow (or Crowe; 1765–1829) was an English (Manx) sea voyager, privateer, and slaver. He was captain of several merchant vessels in the African trade; and his Memoirs, posthumously published, are notable for their descriptions of the west coast of Africa.

Life 

Hugh Crow was born at Ramsey in the Isle of Man in 1765, the son of the tradesman Edmund Crow (1730–1809) by his wife, Judith (1737–1807). He lost his right eye in infancy, but despite this handicap was apprenticed to a boat builder and adopted a seafaring life. He became captain of a merchant vessel, and was long engaged in the African trade. In 1808 he retired from active service, and resided for some years in his native town, but in 1817 he fixed his residence in Liverpool, where he died on 13 May 1829.

Works 
His Memoirs, published at London in 1830, 8vo, with his portrait prefixed, contain descriptions of the west coast of Africa, particularly the Kingdom of Bonny, and of the manners and customs of the inhabitants.

Popular culture 

In the mid-1970s, the Manx screenwriter Nigel Kneale made his only attempt at writing a stage play; called Crow, it was based upon the memoirs of Hugh Crow. Kneale was unable to find backing to produce the play for the stage, but sold the script to ATV who put it into pre-production for television. Shortly before filming it was cancelled by ATV's managing director, Lew Grade, and Kneale was never told why.

Gallery

See also 

 Bell (1788 ship)

References

Sources 

 
 Kibble-White, Jack (November 2003). "The Magic Word Here is Paradox". Off the Telly. Retrieved 8 October 2022.

Attribution:

Further reading 

 Crow, Hugh (1830). Memoirs of the Late Captain Hugh Crow of Liverpool. London: Longman, Rees, Orme, Brown, and Green. pp. 296–299.
 Grindal, Peter (2016). Opposing the Slavers: The Royal Navy's Campaign Against the Atlantic Slave Trade. London and New York: I. B. Tauris. pp. 51, 53, 57, 102.
 Guy, Stephen. "Last of the slavers". National Museums Liverpool. Retrieved 6 October 2022.
 Pinfold, John, ed. (2007). The Memoirs of Captain Hugh Crow: The Life and Times of a Slave Trade Captain. Oxford: Bodleian Library. pp. v–xxiv.
 Quine, John (1887). "Manx Worthies: Capt. Hugh Crow". Moore, A. W. (ed.). The Manx Note Book, 3(1). Douglas: G. H. Johnson. pp. 38–46.
 Sutton, Charles William, ed. (1876). A List of Lancashire Authors, with Brief Biographical and Bibliographical Notes. Manchester: Abel Heywood & Sons. p. 27.

1765 births
1829 deaths
English privateers
English slave traders